Secreto de Amor is a studio album by Joan Sebastian. Released in 2000 on the Musart label, it was Sebastian's 27th studio album. It won a Lo Nuestro Award for Regional Mexican Album of the Year in 2001. The title track also served as the theme song for the 2001 telenovela "Secreto de amor". In 2015, it was selected by Billboard magazine as one of the "50 Essential Latin Albums of the Last 50 Years".

Track listing
 "Secreto de Amor" [4:35]
 "Amorcito Mio" [2:59]
 "Con Besos" [2:47]
 "Un Idiota" [3:22]
 "Rima" [3:14]
 "El Toro" [3:17]
 "Me Gustas" [3:29]
 "Anoche Hablamos" [3:32]
 "Un Vaquero En La Ciudad" [3:27]
 "Julian" [3:25]

All songs on the album were written and composed by Joan Sebastian.

Sales and certifications

References

2000 albums
Joan Sebastian albums